Double is a 1990 bilingual French / English double album by Canadian singer Roch Voisine as a follow up to the album Hélène. The first CD is all in French, the second all in English. The English tracks were also released as a separate album entitled Roch Voisine.

Album information
The album was recorded in Canada and France, and was mixed in France. Famous singer-songwriter and guitarist Francis Cabrel participated in one of the tracks of the second album.

In France, the album spawned three top three singles : "La berceuse du petit diable" (#3), "Darlin'" (#2), and later "La promesse" (#3) and "Avec tes yeux (Pretty Face)" (#3). The last two singles were released to support Voisine's live album Europe tour, but originally appears on this album.

Double debuted at #4 on 6 December 1990 on the SNEP Albums Chart and had a peak at number two for two weeks. It totaled 26 weeks in the top ten and 73 weeks in the top 50. In 1992, the album earned a 2 x Platinum disc for over 600,000 copies sold.

Track listing

Disc 1 : French
 "Prélude" (Beaulieu) — 1:51
 "Les Jardins de St-Martin (Princesse)" (Voisine) — 3:07
 "La promesse" (Lefebvre, Voisine) — 2:28
 "Elle a peur des hirondelles" (Campbell, Lefebvre, Lessard, Voisine) — 3:48
 "Tu ne sauras jamais" (Lefebvre, Voisine) — 3:59
 "Darlin'" (Ciciola, Decary, Izzo, Voisine) — 4:15
 "Au bout de l'île" (Lefebvre, Voisine) — 2:59 
 "Pour toi" (Albert, Bourquin, Gasté) — 5:03
 "Blue Love Sue" (Decary, Voisine) — 3:02
 "La Berceuse du petit diable" (Little Devil's Lullaby) (Decary, Voisine) — 4:03 
 "Bye-Bye" (Lefebvre, Voisine, Vollant) — 4:06

Disc 2 : English
 "On the Outside" (Campbell, Voisine) — 4:03
 "Waiting" (Voisine) — 3:28
 "Mountain Girl" (Lessard, Voisine) — 3:37
 "A Fishing Day" (Voisine) — 4:09
 "My Fairy Tale" (Campbell, Voisine) — 2:58
 "She Had a Dream" (Voisine) — 3:32
 "Until Death Do Us Part" (Francis Cabrel, Campbell, Voisine) — 3:17
 "Jamie's Girl" (Campbell, Voisine) — 2:25
 "Pretty Face" (Voisine) — 3:16
 "Helen" (English version) (Lessard, Voisine) — 3:43
 "All Wired Up" (Voisine) — 4:00

Personnel
 Musicians
 Backing vocals - Adessa, Sembele Assitan, Bobby Helms, Bruce L. Johnson, Carole Frédericks, Elise Duguay (tracks: 2.02), Georges Costa, James Campbell, Janiece Jamison, Kat Dyson, Kathleen Dyson, Kim Richardson, Norman Groulx, Richard Groulx, Roch Voisine
 Bass - Allan B. Abrahams, Bernard Paganotti, Denis Labrosse, Pierre Duchesne, Sylvain Bolduc
 Cello - Alain Aubut
 Drums - Denis Toupin, Dominique Messier, Peter Barbeau, Richard Provençal
 Guitar - Christian Leroux, Carl Katz, Christian Péloquin, Denis Forcier, Denis Lable, Francis Cabrel, James Campbell, Jean-Marie Benoit, Michael Pucci, Patrice Tison,  Rick Haworth, Roch Voisine, Réjean Bouchard, Réjean Lachance
 Keyboards - Aldo Nova, Luc Gilbert, Marc Beaulieu
 Percussion - Denis Benarrosh, Denis Toupin, Marc Chantereau, Paul Picard
 Piano - Marc Beaulieu, Scott Price
 Strings - Bernard Paganotti, Bertrand Lajudie, Marc Beaulieu, La Philharmonie de Paris, Le Quatuor de la Philharmonie de Paris
 Viola - Gérard Daigle
 Violin - Christian Prévost, Stéphane Allard

 Recording and photo
 Engineer - Philippe Laffont (strings, vocals and background vocals recording), Claude Pons (vocals and background vocals recording)
 Mixing - Manuel "Manu" Guiot, Serge "Bum-Bum" Pauchard
 Mixing assistant - Bruno Sourice
 Recording - Gaétan Pilon, Michael Delaney 
 Recording assistant - Christophe Jauseau, Luc Pellerin, Stanislas BC
 Arranged by Aldo Nova, Bernard Paganotti, Francis Cabrel, Jean-Marie Benoit, Luc Gilbert, Marc Beaulieu, Roch Voisine, Scott Price
 Photo - Tony Frank
 Producer - André Di Cesare, Roch Voisine

References

External links
Roch Voisine Official site album page

1990 albums
Roch Voisine albums